At least two ships of the Peruvian Navy have been named BAP Castilla:

 , was a  launched in 1943 as USS Banquest she was transferred to Peru in 1951 serving until being scrapped in 1979 
 , was a  launched in 1956 as HNLMS Utrecht she was transferred to Peru in 1980 serving until being decommissioned in 1990

Peruvian Navy ship names